Monte Partido (also known as San Miguel del Monte) is a partido in the eastern part of Buenos Aires Province in Argentina.

Geography
The northwest course of the Salado borders with the Partidos of Roque Pérez and General Belgrano. Monte lies in the Humid Pampa, a flat rich-soiled agricultural zone. Drainage is insufficient due to the minimal sloping of the land which causes frequent floods in the area.

Climate

Borders
Northeast with Cañuelas
West with Roque Pérez
Southwest with General Belgrano
South with General Paz

Settlements
Abbott
San Miguel del Monte
Zenón Videla Dorna

Tourism

Fishing and water sports
Laguna de Monte:  lake
Laguna de Las Perdices:  lake
Other lakes:  lake

Ranches
Estancia "El Rosario": Antonio Dorna, a rancher built his ranch in the late 18th century on the banks of the Salado River. It is open to the public.

External links

 Federal site

1779 establishments in South America
Partidos of Buenos Aires Province